Kenville is an unincorporated community in the Municipality of Swan Valley West, Manitoba, Canada.

It hosted a school for the Kenville school district between 1906 and 1967, when it became part of the Swan Valley School Division.

References 

Unincorporated communities in Parkland Region, Manitoba